Julian Kemp is a director of television and film.

Early life 
Kemp was an early member of the Central Junior Television Workshop, as Julian Aubrey, at thirteen years old. Kemp graduating from the Royal Academy of Dramatic Art.

Career 
Kemp has directed films, television drama, television documentary, television animation and television commercials. Kemp has written series and stand-alone dramas.

Awards
Kemp has won BAFTA Awards.

Filmography 
 Hardwicke House, 1987 (as Julian Aubrey)
 Blabbermouth & Stickybeak
 House!
 Last Train to Christmas
 My Last Five Girlfriends
 Roger and the Rottentrolls
 Sherlock Holmes and the Baker Street Irregulars

References

External links 
 http://juliankemp.com/
  
 
 

English film directors
English television directors
Fantasy film directors
Living people
Year of birth missing (living people)